Limpopo Valley Airfield  is an airport serving the Northern Tuli Game Reserve, an area of public and private game reserves in eastern Botswana. The airport is owned by Mashatu Game Reserve with a superseded ICAO code of FBLV.

See also

Transport in Botswana
List of airports in Botswana

References

External links
OpenStreetMap - Tuli Lodge
OurAirports - Limpopo Valley Airport
FallingRain - Limpopo Valley Airport

Airports in Botswana